Thihapate of Tagaung (also known as Nga Nauk Hsan (ငနောက်ဆံ); d. November 1400) was governor of Tagaung from 1367 to 1400. The powerful governor of the northernmost vassal state of Ava was a brother-in-law of King Swa Saw Ke, and had even served as a tutor to Crown Prince Tarabya. In 1380/81, he was even considered by King Swa Saw Ke as a candidate to become king of Arakan although he was ultimately passed over.

Thihapate came to Ava (Inwa) in 1400 to serve as an advisor to his one-time pupil Tarabya, who had become king. With Tarabya becoming mentally unstable, Thihapate assassinated the young king in November 1400, and tried to seize the throne. But the Ava court did not accept him, promptly executed him.

Notes

References

Bibliography
 
 
 

Ava dynasty
1400 deaths